Hopewell is a settlement in Saint Elizabeth Parish, Jamaica.

References

Populated places in Saint Elizabeth Parish